The 2019–20 season will be Fudbalski Klub Partizan's 73nd season in existence and the club's 14th competing in the Serbian SuperLiga.

Transfers

In

Out

Players

Squad

Friendlies

Competitions

Overview

Serbian SuperLiga

Regular season

League table

Results by matchday

Results

Season was suspended on 15 March 2020, as a result of COVID-19 pandemic and declaring state of emergency, and was resumed on 29 May 2020. The season was shortened and the play-offs (championship round and relegation round) were cancelled, and no teams would be relegated.

Serbian Cup

UEFA Europa League

Second qualifying round

Third qualifying round

Play-off round

Group stage

Results

Statistics

Squad statistics

|-
! colspan=14 style="background:black; color:white; text-align:center;"| Goalkeepers

|-
! colspan=14 style="background:black; color:white; text-align:center;"| Defenders

|-
! colspan=14 style="background:black; color:white; text-align:center;"| Midfielders

|-
! colspan=14 style="background:black; color:white; text-align:center;"| Forwards

|-
! colspan=14 style="background:black; color:white; text-align:center;"| Players transferred out during the season

Goal scorers

Last updated: 24 June 2020

Clean sheets

Last updated: 10 June 2020

Disciplinary record

Last updated: 24 June 2020

Game as captain 

Last updated: 24 June 2020

* Players sold or loaned out during the season

References

External links

 Partizanopedia 2019-20

FK Partizan seasons
Partizan
Partizan